{{DISPLAYTITLE:C18H36}}
The molecular formula C18H36 (molar mass: 252.48 g/mol, exact mass: 252.2817 u) may refer to:

 Octadecene
 Tetra-tert-butylethylene